Theinkhathu Saw Hnaung was governor of Sagu in the Kingdom of Ava in the late 14th century. He was a grandson of King Thihathu of Pinya, and was one of the four top commanders of King Swa Saw Ke of Ava. He successfully resisted King Thado Minbya's multiple attempts to take his home region (1365−67). He later submitted to Swa. He served in the war against the southern Hanthawaddy Kingdom between 1386 and 1391 and defended the kingdom against the northern state of Mohnyin.

Queen Shin Bo-Me of Ava was his grand daughter.

Military service
Saw Hnaung was one of the four top generals of King Swa. The other three were Thilawa of Yamethin, Tuyin of Inyi, and Min Pale of Paukmyaing.

Ancestry
The following is his ancestry according to Hmannan Yazawin chronicle. Queen Shin Bo-Me of Ava was his grand-daughter.

References

Bibliography
 
 
 
 
 
 

Burmese generals
Ava dynasty